Nokia Corporation is a Finnish multinational communications corporation, founded in 1865. It is headquartered in Keilaniemi, Espoo, a city neighbouring Finland's capital Helsinki. Nokia is engaged in the manufacturing of mobile devices and in converging Internet and communications industries. Nokia was founded by Fredrik Idestam in 1865. The company was subsequently incorporated in the town of Nokia in 1871.

The following is a list of acquisitions by Nokia since December 1997. During the past few years Nokia has been actively acquiring companies with new technologies and competencies, including also investments in minority positions. Since December 1997, Nokia has acquired 41 companies or businesses. The value of each acquisition is listed in either US dollars or Euros. If the value of an acquisition is not listed, then it is undisclosed.

Acquisitions

Divestments
Since 1996, Nokia has made the following divestments.

Notes

References
General

 
 

Specific

External links
 Official Nokia portal
 Nokia – Financials
 Nokia – Investor Relations
 Nokia Corporation Company Profile at Yahoo!

 
Nokia
Nokia